The Muldraugh Formation is a geological formation in Indiana. It preserves fossils dating back to the Carboniferous period.

See also
 List of fossiliferous stratigraphic units in Indiana

References

 

Carboniferous Indiana
Carboniferous southern paleotropical deposits